Tusitala is a genus of jumping spiders that was first described by George and Elizabeth Peckham in 1902. The name is Samoan, meaning "writer of stories". It is considered a senior synonym of Blaisea.

Species
 it contains ten species, found in Africa and Yemen:
Tusitala ansieae Azarkina & Foord, 2015 – Botswana
Tusitala barbata Peckham & Peckham, 1902 (type) – West, East, Southern Africa
Tusitala discibulba Caporiacco, 1941 – Ethiopia
Tusitala guineensis Berland & Millot, 1941 – Guinea
Tusitala hirsuta Peckham & Peckham, 1902 – Southern, East Africa
Tusitala lutzi Lessert, 1927 – Congo
Tusitala lyrata (Simon, 1903) – Africa
Tusitala proxima Wesolowska & Russell-Smith, 2000 – Tanzania
Tusitala unica Wesolowska & Russell-Smith, 2000 – Tanzania
Tusitala yemenica Wesolowska & van Harten, 1994 – Yemen

References

Salticidae genera
Salticidae
Samoan words and phrases
Spiders of Africa
Spiders of Asia